The 2021 season was the Detroit Lions' 92nd season in the National Football League, the 20th playing their home games at Ford Field and their first under the head coach/general manager tandem of Dan Campbell and Brad Holmes. The Lions finished 3–13–1, failing to improve upon their 5–11 record from the previous season. The Lions began their season 0–8 before tying with the Pittsburgh Steelers in Week 10, in which they nearly beat the Steelers in Pittsburgh for the first time since 1955. However, the Lions would not win a game until Week 13 against the division rival Minnesota Vikings, ending a 15-game, 364-day winless streak. In Week 14, the Lions were eliminated from playoff contention for the fifth consecutive year. They finished the season at the bottom of the NFC North for the fourth consecutive season. However they ended the season on a high note, upsetting two playoff bound teams; the Arizona Cardinals in Week 15 and the top-seeded Green Bay Packers in Week 18.

This was the Lions' first season since 2008 without longtime quarterback Matthew Stafford, as he was traded to the Los Angeles Rams in exchange for quarterback Jared Goff and three draft picks on January 31, 2021.
Stafford would go onto win his first Super Bowl in Super Bowl LVI with the Rams later that postseason.

With the Cincinnati Bengals defeating the Las Vegas Raiders in the postseason, the Lions officially held the longest playoff victory drought in the NFL, not winning a playoff game since the 1991 season.

Offseason

Coaching changes

From  January 19 to February 9, the Lions hired 13 coaches
January 19: Aaron Glenn as defensive coordinator.
January 20: Dan Campbell as head coach.
January 23: Anthony Lynn as offensive coordinator.
January 25: Aubrey Pleasant as defensive back coach and Duce Staley as running backs and assistant head coach.
January 26: Dave Fipp as special teams coordinator.
January 28: Mark Brunell as quarterbacks coach.
January 29: Dom Capers as a senior defensive assistant.
February 3: Todd Wash as defensive line coach, Kelvin Sheppard and Brian Duker as defensive assistants, and Seth Ryan as assistant wide receivers coach.
February 9: Antwaan Randle El as wide receivers coach.

Additions

Departures

Re-signings

Trades

On March 17, the Lions acquired defensive tackle Michael Brockers from the Los Angeles Rams in exchange for a seventh-round draft pick in 2023.

Retirements

Draft

Pre-draft trades 
 The Lions received a 2021 third-round selection as well as 2022 and 2023 first-round selections and quarterback Jared Goff from the Los Angeles Rams in exchange for quarterback Matthew Stafford.
 The Lions traded a conditional sixth-round selection, which could become a fifth rounder, to Dallas in exchange for defensive end Everson Griffen.
 The Lions traded safety Quandre Diggs and a 2021 seventh-round selection to Seattle in exchange for a 2020 fifth-round selection.

Staff

Final roster

Preseason
The Lions' preliminary preseason schedule was announced on May 13. The exact dates and times were announced on May 20.

Regular season

Schedule
The Lions schedule was released on May 13, 2021.

Note: Intra-division opponents are in bold text.

Game summaries

Week 1: vs. San Francisco 49ers

The Lions hosted the San Francisco 49ers to kick off the regular season. The 49ers opened the scoring in the first quarter via a five-yard touchdown pass from Trey Lance to Trent Sherfield. The Lions responded with a six-yard touchdown pass from Jared Goff to T. J. Hockenson to tie the game. The 49ers added 24 points in the second quarter via a 38-yard touchdown run from Elijah Mitchell, a three-yard touchdown run from JaMycal Hasty, a 39-yard interception return by Dre Greenlaw and a 40-yard field goal by Robbie Gould. The Lions added 49-yard field goal by Austin Seibert, making the score 31–10 in favor of San Francisco at half-time. The teams exchanged touchdowns in the third quarter, first a 79-yard touchdown pass from Jimmy Garoppolo to Deebo Samuel for San Francisco, then a 43-yard touchdown pass from Goff to D'Andre Swift. The 49ers extended their lead in the fourth quarter via a 52-yard field goal by Gouble. The Lions added 16 points via a one-yard touchdown run from Jamaal Williams and a two-point conversion pass from Goff to Hockenson, and a two-yard touchdown pass from Goff to Quintez Cephus and a two-point conversion pass from Goff to Cephus. The Lions' attempted comeback failed when they failed to convert from the 49ers' 19-yard line late in the fourth quarter, making the final score 41–33 in favor of San Francisco.

Week 2: at Green Bay Packers

In week 2, the Lions visited their divisional rival the Green Bay Packers on Monday Night Football. The Lions opened the scoring in the first quarter via a five-yard touchdown pass from Jared Goff to Quintez Cephus. The Packers responded with a four-yard touchdown pass from Aaron Rodgers to Aaron Jones to tie the game. The Lions regained the lead in the second quarter via an eight-yard touchdown pass from Goff to T. J. Hockenson. The Packers again tied the game via a one-yard touchdown pass from Rodgers to Jones. The Lions responded with a 43-yard field goal by Austin Seibert, making the score 17–14 in favor of Detroit at half-time. The Lions were held scoreless in the second half. The Packers scored 14 points in the third quarter via a 22-yard touchdown pass from Rodgers to Robert Tonyan, and an 11-yard touchdown pass from Rodgers to Jones. The Packers extended their lead in the fourth quarter via a one-yard touchdown run from Jones, making the final score 35–17 in favor of Green Bay.

Week 3: vs. Baltimore Ravens

In week 3, the Lions hosted the Baltimore Ravens. After a scoreless first quarter, the Ravens scored ten points in the second quarter via a 39-yard field goal by Justin Tucker and a 19-yard touchdown pass from Lamar Jackson to Devin Duvernay, making the score 10–0 in favor of Baltimore at half-time. The Ravens extended their lead in the third quarter via two field goals by Tucker, from 50-yards, and 32-yards, respectively. The Lions finally got on the board via a two-yard touchdown run from D'Andre Swift. The Lions added ten points in the fourth quarter via a one-yard touchdown run from Jamaal Williams, and a 35-yard field goal by Ryan Santoso, giving the Lions their first lead of the game. The Ravens responded with an NFL-record 66-yard field goal by Tucker, making the final score 19–17 in favor of Baltimore. After the game, controversy arose when it was shown that the officials failed to call a delay of game on the Ravens at the Lions' 48 yard line with seven seconds left in the game, which would've pushed the Ravens to their own 47 yard line. Had the officials called the delay of game, the Ravens would've attempted a 71-yard field goal or had a 10-second runoff called against them.

Week 4: at Chicago Bears

In week 4, the Lions visited their divisional rival the Chicago Bears. The Bears opened the scoring in the first quarter via a four-yard touchdown run from David Montgomery. The Bears scored the only points of the second quarter via a nine-yard touchdown run from Montgomery, making the score 14–0 in favor of Chicago at half-time. The Bears scored ten points in the third quarter via a four-yard touchdown run from Damien Williams and a 33-yard field goal by Cairo Santos. The Lions finally got on the board via a four-yard touchdown pass from Jared Goff to Kalif Raymond. The Lions scored the only points of the fourth quarter via a 25-yard touchdown pass from Goff to Raymond, making the final score 24–14 in favor of Chicago.

Week 5: at Minnesota Vikings

In week 5, the Lions visited their divisional rival the Minnesota Vikings. The teams exchanged field goals in the first quarter, first a 39-yard field goal by Austin Seibert for the Lions, then a 38-yard field goal by Greg Joseph for the Vikings. The Vikings added 10 points in the second quarter via a 38-yard field goal by Joseph, and a 15-yard touchdown pass from Kirk Cousins to Alexander Mattison. The Lions responded with a 52-yard field goal by Seibert, making the score 13–6 in favor of Minnesota at half-time. After a scoreless third quarter, the Vikings extended their lead in the fourth quarter via a 55-yard field goal by Joseph. The Lions responded with 11 points via a 40-yard field goal by Seibert and a seven-yard touchdown run from D'Andre Swift and a two-point conversion pass from Jared Goff to KhaDarel Hodge, giving the Lions the lead with 37 seconds left in the quarter. The Vikings responded with a 54-yard field goal by Joseph as time expired, making the final score 19–17 in favor of Minnesota.

Week 6: vs. Cincinnati Bengals

In week 6, the Lions hosted the Cincinnati Bengals. The Bengals opened the scoring in the first quarter via a 24-yard touchdown pass from Joe Burrow to Chris Evans. The Bengals extended their lead in the second quarter via a 38-yard field goal by Evan McPherson, making the score 10–0 in favor of Cincinnati at half-time. The Bengals added 10 points in the third quarter via a 40-yard touchdown pass from Burrow to Joe Mixon and a 40-yard field goal by McPherson. The Bengals extended their lead in the fourth quarter via a two-yard touchdown pass from Burrow to C. J. Uzomah. The Lions finally got on the board via a 35-yard field goal Austin Seibert. The teams exchanged touchdowns, first a seven-yard touchdown pass from Brandon Allen to Auden Tate for the Bengals, then a one-yard touchdown run from D'Andre Swift and a two-point conversion pass from Jared Goff to Amon-Ra St. Brown for the Lions, making the final score 34–11 in favor of Cincinnati. With the loss, the Lions fell to 0–6 to start the season for the first time since 2008 when they finished the season 0–16. With the Jaguars' first win over the Dolphins earlier in the day, the Lions became the NFL's lone winless team.

Week 7: at Los Angeles Rams

In week 7, the Lions visited the Los Angeles Rams. The Lions faced their former quarterback, Matthew Stafford, for the first time since being traded in the offseason, while current Lions quarterback Jared Goff also faced his former team. The Lions opened the scoring in the first quarter via a 63-yard touchdown pass from Goff to D'Andre Swift. The Lions extended their lead via a 37-yard field goal by Austin Seibert. The Rams responded with a 33-yard field goal by Matt Gay. The Lions extended their lead in the second quarter via a 47-yard field goal by Seibert. The Rams responded with 14 points via an 11-yard touchdown pass from Matthew Stafford to Van Jefferson and a two-yard touchdown pass from Stafford to Cooper Kupp, giving the Rams their first lead of the game. The Lions responded with a 41-yard field goal by Seibert, making the score 17–16 in favor of Los Angeles at half-time. The Lions scored the only points of the third quarter via a 31-yard field goal by Seibert to regain the lead. In the fourth quarter, the Rams responded with a five-yard touchdown pass from Stafford to Kupp and a two-point conversion pass from Stafford to Robert Woods to regain the lead. The Lions' attempted comeback failed following an interception by Goff to Jalen Ramsey in the red zone. The Rams extended their lead via a 47-yard field goal by Gay, making the final score 28–19 in favor of Los Angeles.

Week 8: vs. Philadelphia Eagles

In week 8, the Lions hosted the Philadelphia Eagles. The Eagles opened the scoring in the first quarter via a one-yard touchdown run from Boston Scott. The Eagles added 10 points in the second quarter via a 43-yard field goal by Jake Elliott and a four-yard touchdown run from Jordan Howard, making the score 17–0 in favor of Philadelphia at half-time. The Eagles added 21 points in the third quarter via a three-yard touchdown run from Scott, a two-yard touchdown run from Howard and a 33-yard fumble recovery by Darius Slay. The Eagles added six points in the fourth quarter via two field goals by Elliott from 26-yards, and 41-yards, respectively. The Lions finally got on the board via an eight-yard touchdown run from Jermar Jefferson, making the final score 44–6 in favor of Philadelphia. With the loss, the Lions went into their bye week with an 0–8 record.

Week 10: at Pittsburgh Steelers

In week 10, the Lions visited the Pittsburgh Steelers. The Steelers opened the scoring in the first quarter via a nine-yard touchdown pass from Mason Rudolph to James Washington. In the second quarter the Lions responded with a 28-yard touchdown run from Jermar Jefferson to tie the game. The teams then exchanged field goals, first a 20-yard field goal by Chris Boswell for the Steelers, then a 20-yard field goal by Ryan Santoso for the Lions, making the score 10–10 at half-time. In the third quarter the Lions took their first lead of the game via a 42-yard touchdown run from Godwin Igwebuike and a missed extra point by Santoso. The Steelers responded with a 23-yard field goal by Boswell. The Steelers scored the only points of the fourth quarter via a 51-yard field goal by Boswell to tie the game and force overtime. After neither team scored in overtime, the game resulted in a 16–16 tie.

Week 11: at Cleveland Browns

In week 11 the Lions visited the Cleveland Browns. After a scoreless first quarter, the Browns scored 13 points in the second quarter via a 16-yard touchdown run from Jarvis Landry and a five-yard touchdown pass from Baker Mayfield to Nick Chubb, making the score 13–0 in favor of Cleveland at half-time. The Lions finally got on the board in the third quarter via a 57-yard touchdown run from D'Andre Swift. The Lions scored the only points of the fourth quarter via a 43-yard field goal by Aldrick Rosas, making the final score 13–10 in favor of Cleveland.

Week 12: vs. Chicago Bears

For their annual Thanksgiving Day game, the Lions hosted a rematch against their divisional rival the Chicago Bears. The Lions unsuccessfully attempted to win their first game on Thanksgiving since 2016, as well as end their 14-game non-winning streak dating back to week 13 of the 2020 season, which was also against the Bears. The Lions opened the scoring in the first quarter via a 39-yard touchdown pass from Jared Goff to Josh Reynolds. The Bears scored 13 points in the second quarter via a 28-yard field goal by Cairo Santos, a 17-yard touchdown pass from Andy Dalton to Jimmy Graham, and a 43-yard field goal by Santos, which made the score 13–7 in favor of Chicago at half-time. The Lions scored the only points of the third quarter via a 17-yard touchdown pass from Goff to T. J. Hockenson to regain the lead. The Bears responded with a 28-yard field goal by Santos as time expired, making the final score 16–14 in favor of Chicago.

Week 13: vs. Minnesota Vikings

In week 13, the Lions hosted a rematch against their divisional rival the Minnesota Vikings. The Vikings scored six points in the first quarter via two field goals by Greg Joseph, from 41-yards, and 31-yards, respectively. The Lions scored 20 points in the second quarter via a nine-yard touchdown pass from Jared Goff to T. J. Hockenson, a 23-yard touchdown pass from Goff to Brock Wright, and two field goals by Riley Patterson, from 31-yards, and 41-yards, respectively, making the score 20–6 in favor of Detroit at half-time. The Vikings scored nine points in the third quarter via a 31-yard field goal by Joseph, and an eight-yard touchdown run from Alexander Mattison. The Lions extended their lead via a 49-yard field goal by Patterson. The Vikings regained the lead in the fourth quarter after they scored 12 points via a five-yard touchdown pass from Kirk Cousins to K. J. Osborn, and a three-yard touchdown pass from Cousins to Justin Jefferson. The Lions responded with a game-winning drive down the field, and an 11-yard touchdown pass from Goff to Amon-Ra St. Brown as time expired, making the final score 29–27 in favor of Detroit, ending the Lions' 15 game winless streak, their last win being 364 days before. The Lions dedicated the win to the four victims who were killed in the 2021 Oxford High School shooting.

Week 14: at Denver Broncos

In week 14, the Lions visited the Denver Broncos. The Broncos scored 14 points in the first quarter via a five-yard touchdown run from Javonte Williams and a one-yard touchdown run from Melvin Gordon. The Lions scored 10 points in the second quarter via a seven-yard touchdown pass from Jared Goff to Kalif Raymond and a 36-yard field goal by Riley Patterson. The Broncos responded with a 52-yard field goal by Brandon McManus, which made the score 17–10 in favor of Denver at half-time. The Lions were held scoreless in the second half. The Broncos scored 14 points in the third quarter via a 10-yard touchdown pass from Teddy Bridgewater to Williams and a 14-yard touchdown run from Gordon. The Broncos scored the only points of the fourth quarter via a four-yard touchdown pass from Bridgewater to Albert Okwuegbunam, making the final score 38–10 in favor of Denver. With the loss, the Lions were mathematically eliminated from playoff contention for the fifth straight year.

Week 15: vs. Arizona Cardinals

In week 15, the Lions hosted the Arizona Cardinals. The Lions opened the scoring in the first quarter via a 37-yard field goal by Riley Patterson. The Lions scored 14 points in the second quarter via a 37-yard touchdown pass from Jared Goff to Amon-Ra St. Brown and a 22-yard touchdown pass from Goff to Josh Reynolds, which made the score 17–0 in favor of Detroit at half-time. The Cardinals finally got on the board in the third quarter via a 29-yard field goal by Matt Prater. The Lions extended their lead via a six-yard touchdown pass from Goff to Jason Cabinda. The Cardinals responded with a 29-yard field goal by Prater. The Lions extended their lead in the fourth quarter via a 47-yard field goal by Patterson. The Cardinals responded with a 26-yard touchdown pass from Kyler Murray to Christian Kirk. The Lions scored the final points of the game via a 45-yard field goal by Patterson, making the final score 30–12 in favor of Detroit.

Week 16: at Atlanta Falcons

In week 16, the Lions visited the Atlanta Falcons. The Lions opened the scoring in the first quarter via a 26-yard field goal by Riley Patterson. The teams exchanged touchdowns in the second quarter, first a six-yard touchdown run from Cordarrelle Patterson for the Falcons, then a 20-yard touchdown pass from Tim Boyle to Amon-Ra St. Brown for the Lions. The Falcons scored the final points of the half via a 53-yard field goal by Younghoe Koo, tying the score at 10–10 at half-time. The teams exchanged field goals in the third quarter, first a 48-yard field goal by Koo for the Falcons, then a 37-yard field goal by Patterson for the Lions. The Falcons took their first lead of the game in the fourth quarter via a 12-yard touchdown pass from Matt Ryan to Hayden Hurst. The Lions responded with a 26-yard field goal by Patterson, making the final score 20–16 in favor of Atlanta.

Week 17: at Seattle Seahawks

In week 17, the Lions visited the Seattle Seahawks. The Seahawks scored ten points in the first quarter via a 15-yard touchdown run from Rashaad Penny and a 51-yard field goal by Jason Myers. The Lions finally got on the board in the second quarter via a 26-yard touchdown run from Amon-Ra St. Brown. The Seahawks scored 21 points in the quarter via a six-yard touchdown run from Penny, a 13-yard touchdown pass from Russell Wilson to DK Metcalf and a one-yard touchdown pass from Wilson to Tyler Lockett, which made the score 31–7 in favor of Seattle at half-time. The Seahawks extended their lead in the third quarter via a 13-yard touchdown pass from Wilson to Metcalf. The Lions responded with 15 points via a one-yard touchdown run from Jamaal Williams and two-point conversion pass from Tim Boyle to St. Brown, and a six-yard touchdown pass from Boyle to Taylor Decker. The teams exchanged touchdowns in the fourth quarter, first a one-yard touchdown pass from Wilson to Metcalf for the Seahawks, then a one-yard touchdown run from Williams for the Lions. The Seahawks extended their lead via two field goals by Myers from 36-yards, and 42-yards, respectively, making the final score 51–29 in favor of Seattle. The loss also meant the Lions finished last in the NFC for the first time since 2008, when they finished 0–16.

Week 18: vs. Green Bay Packers

To finish their season, the Lions hosted a rematch with their divisional rival, the Green Bay Packers. The teams exchanged touchdowns in the first quarter, first a one-yard touchdown pass from Aaron Rodgers to Allen Lazard for the Packers, then a 75-yard touchdown pass from Tom Kennedy to Kalif Raymond for the Lions. The Lions took their first lead of the game in the second quarter via a two-yard touchdown pass from Jared Goff to Amon-Ra St. Brown. The Packers responded with a 29-yard touchdown pass from Rodgers to Lazard, and a missed extra point by Mason Crosby. The Lions scored the final points of the half via a 34-yard field goal by Riley Patterson, which made the score 17–13 in favor of Detroit at half-time. The Lions extended their lead in the third quarter via a 36-yard touchdown pass from Goff to Brock Wright. The Packers responded with a 36-yard field goal by Crosby. The Packers scored 14 points in the fourth quarter via a one-yard touchdown run from Patrick Taylor and a failed two-point conversion attempt, then a 62-yard touchdown pass from Jordan Love to Josiah Deguara and a two-point conversion run from Love to regain the lead for the first time since the first quarter. The Lions scored 13 points in the quarter via a 36-yard field goal by Patterson, a 14-yard touchdown run from D'Andre Swift and a 27-yard field goal by Patterson, making the final score 37–30 in favor of Detroit.

Standings

Division

Conference

References

External links
 

Detroit
Detroit Lions seasons
Detroit Lions